Gamal Mohamed may refer to:
 Gamal Fawzi Mohamed, Egyptian field hockey player
 Gamal Mohamed (wrestler) Egyptian freestyle wrestler